{{DISPLAYTITLE:C6H9NO3}}
The molecular formula C6H9NO3 (molar mass: 143.142 g/mol) may refer to:

 Methyl 2-acetamidoacrylate, organic compound
 Trimethadione, an oxazolidinedione anticonvulsant

Molecular formulas